This is a list of moth species of the family Geometridae that are found in India.

It also acts as an index to the species articles and forms part of the full List of moths of India.

This list is based on a 2016 publication by Gunathilagaraj Kandasamy that included 1938 names (including synonyms) in 383 genera.

Abaciscus intractabilis (Walker, 1864)
Abaciscus tristis Butler, 1889
Abraxaphantes perampla (Swinhoe, 1890)
Abraxas abrasata Warren, 1898
Abraxas adusta Hampson, 1891
Abraxas alpestris Warren, 1893
Abraxas capitata Warren, 1894
Abraxas disrupta Warren, 1894
Abraxas ditritaria Walker, 1862
Abraxas elaioides Wehrli, 1931
Abraxas etridoides Hampson, 1895
Abraxas fasciaria Guerin-Meneville, 1843
Abraxas fuscescens Butler, 1886
Abraxas germana Swinhoe, 1891
Abraxas illuminata Warren, 1894
Abraxas intermedia Warren, 1888
Abraxas irrorata Moore, 1867
Abraxas irrula Hampson, 1891
Abraxas kanoi Inoue, 1970
Abraxas labraria Guenée, 1858
Abraxas latizonata Hampson, 1907
Abraxas leopardina (Kollar, 1844)
Abraxas leucostola Hampson, 1893
Abraxas luteolaria (Swinhoe, 1889)
Abraxas martaria Guenée, 1858
Abraxas metamorpha Warren, 1893
Abraxas nigrivena Warren, 1893
Abraxas notata Warren, 1894
Abraxas ostrina Swinhoe, 1889
Abraxas paucinotata Warren, 1894
Abraxas picaria (Moore, 1867)
Abraxas poliaria Swinhoe, 1889
Abraxas poliostrota Hampson, 1907
Abraxas prosthetocneca Prout, 1925
Abraxas punctifera Walker, 1864
Abraxas pusilla Butler, 1880
Abraxas sordida Hampson, 1893
Abraxas sylvata Scopoli, 1763
Abraxas symmetrica Warren, 1894
Abraxas todara Swinhoe, 1889
Abraxas triseriaria Herrich-Schäffer, 1855
Abraxas triseriata Warren, 1893
Abraxas virginalis Butler, 1886
Abraxesis melaleucaria Hampson, 1902
Acacis viretata Hübner,
Acacis viretata himalayica Prout, 1958
Acolutha bicristipennis Prout, 1931
Acolutha flavipictaria Prout, 1922
Acolutha pictaria (Moore, 1888)
Acolutha pulchella (Hampson, 1895)
Actenochroma muscicoloraria Walker, 1862
Agaraeus discolor Warren, 1893
Agathia angustilimes Prout, 1926
Agathia arcuata Moore, 1867
Agathia beata Butler, 1880
Agathia carissima prasina Swinhoe, 1893
Agathia codina Swinhoe, 1892
Agathia conviridaria (Hübner, 1823)
Agathia diversiformis Warren, 1894
Agathia gemma Swinhoe, 1892
Agathia gigantea Butler, 1880
Agathia hemithearia Guenée, 1857
Agathia hilarata Guenée, 1858
Agathia incudaria antitheta Prout
Agathia laetata Fabricius, 1794
Agathia laetata andamanensis Prout, 1932
Agathia laetata isogyna Prout, 1916
Agathia laqueifera Prout, 1912
Agathia lycaenaria (Kollar, 1844)
Agathia lycaenaria impar Prout, 1916
Agathia magnifica Moore, 1879
Agathia quinaria Moore, 1867
Agathia visenda Butler, 1880
Agathia visenda gaudens Prout, 1932
Aglossochloris radiata (Walker, 1863)
Agnibesa pictaria (Moore, 1867)
Agnibesa plumbeolineata (Hampson, 1895)
Agnibesa recurvilineta Moore, 1888
Agnibesa venusta Warren, 1897
Alcis admissaria (Guenée, 1858)
Alcis albifera (Moore, 1887)
Alcis atrostipata (Walker, 1862)
Alcis decussata (Moore, 1867)
Alcis granitaria (Moore, 1888)
Alcis holophaearia (Hampson, 1907)
Alcis imbecilis (Moore, 1888)
Alcis iterata Butler, 1886
Alcis jubata (Thunberg, 1788)
Alcis latifasciata Warren, 1893)
Alcis megaspilaria (Moore, 1867)
Alcis nigralbata Warren, 1893
Alcis nigridorsaria (Guenée, 1858)
Alcis nilgirica (Hampson, 1895)
Alcis orbifer Warren, 1896
Alcis perspicuata (Moore, 1867)
Alcis pleniferata (Walker, 1862)
Alcis semiclarata (Walker, 1862)
Alcis stictineura (Hampson, 1907)
Alcis sublimis (Butler, 1889)
Alcis subnitida Warren, 1893
Alcis subolivacea (Hampson, 1907)
Alcis subrufaria Warren, 1893
Alcis tenera Warren, 1893
Alcis trikotaria (Felder, 1874)
Alcis variegata (Moore, 1888)
Alcis variegata nebulosa (Swinhoe, 1891)
Alcis venustularia (Walker, 1866)
Alcis vialis (Moore, 1888)
Alex palparia (Walker, 1861)
Allaxitheca purpurascens (Moore, 1887)
Amblychia angeronaria Guenée, 1858
Amnesicoma albiseriata Warren, 1893)
Amnesicoma bicolor Moore, 1888
Amorphozancle discata Warren, 1893
Anisodes absconditaria Walker, 1862
Anisodes absconditaria assamica Prout, 1938
Anisodes apogona Prout, 1938
Anisodes arenosaria Moore, 1887
Anisodes argentosa Prout, 1920
Anisodes argyromma Warren, 1896
Anisodes clandestina Prout, 1918
Anisodes contrariata (Walker, 1861)
Anisodes decretarioides Holloway
Anisodes denticulata Hampson, 1895
Anisodes discofera Swinhoe, 1894
Anisodes dotilla Swinhoe, 1894
Anisodes flavirubra Warren, 1896
Anisodes flavispila Warren, 1896)
Anisodes frenaria Guenée, 1858
Anisodes frenaria pulverulenta (Swinhoe, 1892)
Anisodes griseata belgaumensis Prout, 1938
Anisodes heydena Swinhoe, 1894
Anisodes illepidaria Guenée, 1858
Anisodes insitiva Prout, 1920
Anisodes intermixtaria Swinhoe, 1892
Anisodes interpulsata Walker, 1861
Anisodes intortaria Guenée, 1858
Anisodes jocosa Warren, 1896
Anisodes maximaria Guenée, 1858
Anisodes monetaria Guenée, 1858
Anisodes nebulosata Walker, 1862
Anisodes obliviaria Walker, 1861
Anisodes obrinaria (Guenée, 1858)
Anisodes obstataria Walker, 1861
Anisodes pallida Moore, 1889
Anisodes perscripta Warren, 1896)
Anisodes posticamplum (Swinhoe, 1892)
Anisodes sarawackaria lichenaria Swinhoe, 1892
Anisodes subdolaria Swinhoe, 1885
Anisodes thermosaria Walker, 1862
Anisodes variospila Warren, 1901)
Anisozyga gavissima (Walker, 1861)
Anisozyga textilis (Butler, 1880)
Anonychia diversilinea Warren, 1897
Anonychia lativitta (Moore, 1888)
Anonychia rostrifera Warren, 1888)
Anonychia strebla Prout, 1926
Anthyperythra caladsaota Hampson, 1902
Anthyperythra hermearia Swinhoe, 1891
Antimimistis attenuata (Moore, 1887)
Antimimistis subteracta Prout, 1925
Antitrygodes agrata vicina (Thierry-Mieg, 1907)
Antitrygodes cuneilinea (Walker, 1862)
Antitrygodes divisaria (Walker, 1861)
Antitrygodes ircina (Thierry-Mieg, 1907)
Anydrelia dharmasalae (Butler, 1883)
Apeira viridescens Warren, 1894)
Apithecia viridata (Moore, 1868)
Aplocera curvilineata (Walker, 1863)
Aplocera plagiata (Linnaeus, 1758)
Aplochlora vivilaca Walker, 1861
Apophyga sericea Warren, 1893)
Aporandria specularia (Guenée, 1857)
Apostegania crina (Swinhoe, 1892)
Archiplutodes prasina (Swinhoe, 1892)
Arichanna albovittata Moore, 1887
Arichanna biquadrata Warren, 1893
Arichanna commixta Warren, 1893
Arichanna consocia Butler, 1880
Arichanna conspersa Butler, 1880
Arichanna diversicolor Warren, 1888)
Arichanna flavinigra Hampson, 1907
Arichanna furcifera Moore, 1888
Arichanna hamiltonia (Swinhoe, 1895)
Arichanna interplagata (Guenée, 1858)
Arichanna jaguarinaria (Oberthür, 1881)
Arichanna lapsariata (Walker, 1862)
Arichanna luciguttata Warren, 1893)
Arichanna maculata (Moore, 1867)
Arichanna marginata Warren, 1893
Arichanna plagifera Walker, 1866
Arichanna rubrifusa Hampson, 1907
Arichanna rubrivena Warren, 1893
Arichanna sparsa (Butler, 1890)
Arichanna subaenescens Warren, 1893
Arichanna subalbida Warren, 1893
Arichanna tenebraria (Moore, 1867)
Arichanna tramesata Moore, 1867
Arichanna transectata (Walker, 1862)
Arichanna transfasciata Warren, 1893
Arichanna violacea Warren, 1893)
Ascotis selenaria (Schiffermüller, 1775)
Asthena albosignata (Moore, 1888)
Asthena livida Warren, 1896)
Atopophysa indistincta (Butler, 1889)
Auzeodes chalybeata (Walker, 1866)
Berta acte (Swinhoe, 1892)
Berta albiplaga Warren, 1893
Berta angustimedia Prout, 1918
Berta annulifera Warren, 1896
Berta anteplaga Prout, 1916
Berta chrysolineata Walker, 1863
Berta copiosa Prout, 1917
Biston cognataria Guenée, 1858
Biston falcata Warren, 1893)
Biston porphyria (Butler, 1889)
Biston regalis Moore, 1888
Biston sinuata Hampson, 1895
Bithiodes obliquata (Moore, 1888)
Blepharoctenucha virescens (Butler, 1880)
Boarmia adamata Felder, 1874
Boarmia albibasis Hampson, 1895
Boarmia arcearia Hampson, 1902
Boarmia biserrata Hampson, 1902
Boarmia bisinuata Hampson, 1895
Boarmia carinenta (Cramer, 1777)
Boarmia cervina Hampson, 1895
Boarmia ceylonaria Nietner, 1861
Boarmia cineracea Moore, 1888
Boarmia cyclophora Hampson, 1902
Boarmia diffusaria Albers, 1849
Boarmia fimbriata Moore, 1867
Boarmia flavimedia Hampson, 1895
Boarmia glaucocincta Hampson, 1907
Boarmia glaucodisca Swinhoe, 1894
Boarmia hibernaria (Swinhoe, 1885)
Boarmia infixaria Walker, 1860
Boarmia latifascia Hampson, 1895
Boarmia leucocyma Hampson, 1907
Boarmia leucodontata Hampson, 1896
Boarmia leucozona (Hampson, 1895)
Boarmia melanosticta Hampson, 1895
Boarmia nepalensis Hampson, 1902
Boarmia nigralbata Warren, 1893
Boarmia pallida Hampson, 1891
Boarmia plumalis Butler, 1886
Boarmia polystrota Hampson, 1907
Boarmia procursaria Walker, 1860
Boarmia reparata Walker, 1860
Boarmia rubrifusa Warren, 1893
Boarmia semialba (Moore, 1887)
Boarmia separata Walker, 1860
Boarmia separata intectaria (Walker, 1862)
Boarmia serratilinea Warren, 1896)
Boarmia suasaria Guenée, 1857
Boarmia subtochracea Hampson, 1902
Borbacha pardaria Guenée, 1857
Brabira artemidora (Oberthür, 1884)
Brabira artemidora pallida Moore, 1888
Brabira atkinsonii Moore, 1888
Brabira operosa Prout, 1958
Buzura bengaliaria (Guenée, 1858)
Buzura recursaria (Walker, 1860)
Buzura suppressaria (Guenée, 1858)
Buzura varianaria Swinhoe, 1889
Bylazora infumata (Felder, 1874)
Bylazora licheniferata Walker, 1862
Bylazora pilicostata (Walker, 1862)
Cacochloris uvidula (Swinhoe, 1885)
Calicha retrahens Moore, 1888
Callabraxas amanda Butler, 1880
Callerinnys combusta Warren, 1893
Callerinnys fuscomarginata Warren, 1893
Callerinnys obliquilinea Moore, 1888
Calletaera subexpressa (Walker, 1861)
Calletaera subexpressa angulata Warren, 1896
Calluga cissocosma (Turner, 1904)
Calluga costalis (Moore, 1887)
Calluga lophoceras Prout, 1931
Callygris compositata (Guenée, 1857)
Campaea biseriata (Moore, 1888)
Camptolophia marmorata Warren, 1896
Capasa abstractaria (Walker, 1862)
Capasa festivaria (Fabricius, 1794)
Capasa flavifusata (Moore, 1887)
Capasa hyadaria (Guenée, 1858)
Capasa iris (Butler, 1880)
Capasa lycoraria (Guenée, 1858)
Capasa muscicolor Warren, 1893)
Capasa pachiaria (Walker, 1860)
Capasa pulchraria (Rothschild, 1894)
Capasa pyrrhularia (Guenée, 1857)
Capasa quadraria Warren, 1893)
Capasa rufescens (Butler, 1886)
Capasa sternaria (Guenée, 1857)
Capasa venusa (Swinhoe, 1894)
Carbia nexilinea Warren, 1898)
Carige cruciplaga (Walker, 1861)
Carige lunulineata Moore, 1888
Carige rachiaria Swinhoe, 1891
Cassephyra cyanosticta (Hampson, 1907)
Cassephyra lamprosticta Hampson, 1895
Cassyma deletaria (Moore, 1888)
Cassyma indistincta (Moore, 1887)
Cassyma pallidula Warren, 1896)
Cataclysme conturbata (Walker, 1863)
Cataclysme obliquilineata Hampson, 1895
Cataclysme polygramma Hampson, 1907
Catoria olivescens Moore, 1888
Catoria sublavaria Guenée, 1857
Celerena andamana Felder, 1875
Celerena divisa Walker, 1862
Centronaxa orthostigialis Warren, 1893)
Ceruncina translineata Walker, 1863
Chaetolopha incurvata (Moore, 1888)
Chalyboclydon flexilinea Warren, 1898
Chalyboclydon marginata Warren, 1893
Chartographa trigoniplaga (Hampson, 1895)
Chiannia khasiana (Moore, 1888)
Chloeres albifimbria Warren, 1896)
Chloeres dyakaria (Walker, 1861)
Chloeres quantula (Swinhoe, 1885)
Chlorissa aquamarina (Hampson, 1895)
Chlorissa discessa (Walker, 1861)
Chlorissa distinctaria (Walker, 1866)
Chlorissa distinctaria laeta (Prout, 1917)
Chlorissa gelida (Butler, 1889)
Chlorissa gelida exsoluta Prout
Chlorissa nigropunctata Warren, 1893)
Chlorissa punctifimbria Warren, 1896)
Chlorissa rubripicta Warren, 1893)
Chlorochaeta albicatena (Warren, 1896)
Chlorochaeta albimarginata Warren, 1893
Chlorochaeta biplaga (Walker, 1861)
Chlorochaeta cassidara (Guenée, 1857)
Chlorochaeta chalybeata Moore, 1867
Chlorochaeta delineata Warren, 1893)
Chlorochaeta inductaria (Guenée, 1857)
Chlorochaeta integranota (Hampson, 1893)
Chlorochaeta pictipennis (Butler, 1880)
Chlorochaeta quadrinotata (Butler, 1889)
Chlorochaeta quadrinotata fuscidorsata (Prout, 1912)
Chlorochaeta signifera Warren, 1893)
Chlorochaeta subhyalina Warren, 1899)
Chlorochaeta tenera Warren, 1896)
Chloroclystis actephilae Prout, 1958
Chloroclystis acygonia Swinhoe, 1895
Chloroclystis admixtaria (Walker, 1862)
Chloroclystis atroviridis Warren, 1893)
Chloroclystis breyniae Prout, 1958
Chloroclystis chlorophilata Walker, 1863
Chloroclystis consobrina Warren, 1901)
Chloroclystis conversa Warren, 1897)
Chloroclystis curviscapulis Prout, 1958
Chloroclystis decolorata Warren, 1900)
Chloroclystis emarginaria (Hampson, 1893)
Chloroclystis filicata (Swinhoe, 1892)
Chloroclystis griseorufa (Hampson, 1898)
Chloroclystis immixtaria (Walker, 1862)
Chloroclystis inaequata (Warren, 1896)
Chloroclystis inexplicata Walker, 1866
Chloroclystis infrazebrina (Hampson, 1895)
Chloroclystis intentata (Walker, 1866)
Chloroclystis lanaris Warren, 1896)
Chloroclystis laticostata Walker, 1862
Chloroclystis modesta Warren, 1893
Chloroclystis naga Prout, 1958
Chloroclystis olivata Warren, 1901)
Chloroclystis palpata (Walker, 1852)
Chloroclystis palpata diechusa Prout, 1958
Chloroclystis papillosa Warren, 1896)
Chloroclystis patinata (Warren, 1897)
Chloroclystis plicata Hampson, 1912
Chloroclystis polygraphata Hampson, 1912
Chloroclystis recensitaria (Walker, 1862)
Chloroclystis rectaria Hampson, 1903
Chloroclystis rubrinotata Warren, 1893)
Chloroclystis rubroviridis Warren, 1896)
Chloroclystis sinuosa Swinhoe, 1895
Chloroclystis sinuosa nigrilineata Hampson, 1896
Chloroclystis spissidentata Warren, 1893)
Chloroclystis subcostalis Hampson, 1893
Chloroclystis subusta Warren, 1895)
Chloroclystis taraxichroma Prout, 1958
Chloroclystis trichophora Hampson, 1895
Chloroclystis vata lucinda (Butler, 1879)
Chloroclystis xanthocomes (Prout, 1926)
Chlorodontopera chalybeata (Moore, 1872)
Chlorodontopera discospilata (Moore, 1867)
Chloromachia albisparsa (Walker, 1861)
Chloromachia aureofulva Warren, 1897
Chloromachia divapala (Walker, 1861)
Chloromianta ferruginata Warren, 1896
Chloromma mimica Warren, 1896
Chloroparda palliplagiata (Walker, 1863)
Chloropteryx opalaria Guenée, 1857
Chlororithra fea (Butler, 1889)
Chlorozancla falcatus (Hampson, 1895)
Chorodna adumbrata Moore, 1887
Chorodna erebusaria Walker, 1860
Chorodna metaphaeria (Walker, 1862)
Chorodna pallidularia Moore, 1867
Chorodna praetextata (Felder, 1874)
Chorodna testaceata Moore, 1867
Chorodna vulpinaria Moore, 1867
Chrioloba andrewesi Prout, 1958
Chrioloba bifasciata (Hampson, 1891)
Chrioloba bifasciata dentifascia Warren, 1904
Chrioloba cinerea (Butler, 1880)
Chrioloba cinerea plumbeola Prout, 1936
Chrioloba etaina Swinhoe, 1900
Chrioloba indicaria (Guerin-Meneville, 1843)
Chrioloba ochraceistriga Prout, 1958
Chrioloba olivaria Swinhoe, 1897
Chrioloba olivescens Hampson, 1902
Chrioloba subusta Warren, 1893)
Chrioloba trinotata Warren, 1893)
Chrysocraspeda abhadraca (Walker, 1861)
Chrysocraspeda conspicuaria Swinhoe, 1905
Chrysocraspeda fulviplaga Swinhoe, 1905
Chrysocraspeda gibbosa Warren, 1896
Chrysocraspeda iole (Swinhoe, 1892)
Chrysocraspeda mitigata (Walker, 1861)
Chrysocraspeda olearia Guenée, 1857
Chrysocraspeda perpicta Warren, 1896
Chrysocraspeda plumbeofusa Swinhoe, 1894
Chrysocraspeda sanguinea Warren, 1896
Chrysocraspeda subangulata Warren, 1896
Cidaria antauges Prout, 1935
Cidaria basharica Bang-Haas, 1927
Cidaria cingala (Moore, 1887)
Cidaria deletaria Hampson, 1902
Cidaria fulvata Forster, 1771
Cidaria ochripennis Prout, 1914
Cleora acaciaria Boisduval, 1834
Cleora alienaria (Walker, 1860)
Cleora alienaria gelidaria (Walker, 1863)
Cleora contiguata (Moore, 1867)
Cleora cornaria (Guenée, 1858)
Cleora cucullata (D. S. Fletcher, 1953)
Cleora falculata (D. S. Fletcher, 1953)
Cleora fraterna (Moore, 1888)
Cleora impletaria (Walker, 1862)
Cleora injectaria Walker, 1860
Cleora inoffensa (Swinhoe, 1902)
Cleora inoffensa cinereomarginata D. S. Fletcher, 1953
Cleora onycha (D. S. Fletcher, 1953)
Cleora processaria (Walker, 1860)
Cleora propulsaria (Walker, 1860)
Cleora subnigrata Warren, 1901)
Cleora taprobana (D. S. Fletcher, 1953)
Cleora tenebrata (D. S. Fletcher, 1953)
Cleora undaria (Fabricius, 1794)
Cleora vatia Prout, 1927
Coenotephria brevifasciata Warren, 1888)
Coenotephria championi Prout, 1926
Coenotephria flavistrigata Warren, 1888)
Coenotephria homophana (Hampson, 1895)
Coenotephria homophoeta Prout, 1926
Collix ghosha Walker, 1862
Collix griseipalpis Wileman, 1916
Collix hypospilata Guenée, 1858
Collix leuciota Prout, 1924
Collix rufipalpis (Hampson, 1907)
Collix stellata Warren, 1894
Colostygia albigirata (Kollar, 1844)
Colostygia ustipennis (Hampson, 1895)
Comostola chlorargyra (Walker, 1861)
Comostola dispansa (Walker, 1861)
Comostola hypotyphla Prout, 1917
Comostola inops Prout, 1912
Comostola laesaria (Walker, 1861)
Comostola maculata (Moore, 1867)
Comostola mundata Warren, 1896
Comostola ovifera Warren, 1893)
Comostola subtiliaria (Bremer, 1864)
Comostola subtiliaria demeritaria Prout, 1917
Comostola virago Prout, 1926
Conolophia helicola (Swinhoe, 1894)
Conolophia nigripuncta (Hampson, 1891)
Corymica arnearia Walker, 1860
Corymica deducta Walker, 1866
Corymica exiguinota Hampson, 1891
Corymica immaculata Warren, 1897
Corymica pryeri Butler, 1878
Corymica spatiosa Prout, 1925
Corymica specularia Moore, 1867
Corymica vesicularia Walker, 1866
Cosmorhoe argentilineata (Moore, 1867)
Cosmorhoe chalybearia (Moore, 1867)
Cosmorhoe maia Prout, 1940
Cosmorhoe neelys (Prout, 1940)
Cosmorhoe siderifera (Moore, 1888)
Craspediopsis bimaculata Warren, 1895
Craspediopsis inaequata Warren, 1896
Craspediopsis pallivittata (Moore, 1867)
Craspediopsis persimilis (Moore, 1888)
Cryptoloba aerata (Moore, 1867)
Cryptoloba mesta Prout, 1958
Cryptoloba minor Warren, 1893
Cryptoloba peperitis Prout, 1958
Ctenognophos eolaria (Guenée, 1858)
Ctenognophos methoria Prout, 1926
Ctenognophos niguzaria Walker, 1860
Ctenognophos obtectaria (Walker, 1866)
Ctenognophos paerlita Butler, 1886
Ctenognophos ventraria Guenée, 1858
Culcula panterinaria Bremer & Grey, 1855
Curbia martiata (Guenée, 1858)
Cusiala boarmoides (Moore, 1887)
Cusiala raptaria (Walker, 1860)
Cusuma flavifusa Hampson, 1893
Cusuma vilis (Walker, 1854)
Cyclothea disjuncta (Walker, 1861)
Cystidia indrasana Moore, 1865
Dalima apicata (Moore, 1867)
Dalima calamina (Butler, 1880)
Dalima gigantea Swinhoe, 1897
Dalima intricata Warren, 1893
Dalima latitans Warren, 1893)
Dalima lucens Warren, 1893
Dalima nubilata Hampson, 1895
Dalima patularia (Walker, 1860)
Dalima schistacearia Moore, 1867
Dalima truncataria Moore, 1867
Dalima vulpinaria (Moore, 1887)
Debos iratus Swinhoe, 1885
Derambila costata Warren, 1896
Derambila fragilis Butler, 1880
Derambila gertraudae Sommerer, 1995
Derambila infelix (Swinhoe, 1885)
Derambila lumenaria (Geyer, 1837)
Derambila saponaria (Guenée, 1858)
Derambila satelliata (Walker, 1866)
Derambila satelliata dentifera (Moore, 1888)
Dilophodes amplificata Bastelberger, 1905
Dilophodes elegans (Butler, 1878)
Dilophodes elegans khasiana (Swinhoe, 1892)
Dindica olivacea Inoue, 1990
Dindica para (Swinhoe, 1891)
Dindica polyphaenaria Guenée, 1857
Dindica subrosea Warren, 1893)
Diplurodes coremiaria (Hampson, 1896)
Discalma normata (Walker, 1861)
Dischidesia cinerea (Butler, 1889)
Discoglypha aureifloris Warren, 1896
Discoglypha hampsoni (Swinhoe, 1892)
Discoglypha inflammata Warren, 1896
Discoglypha locupletata Prout, 1917
Discoglypha punctimargo (Hampson, 1895)
Discoglypha sanguinata Warren, 1896)
Discoglypha variostigma Warren, 1896
Dithecodes idaea (Swinhoe, 1892)
Docirava aequilineata Walker, 1863
Docirava fulgurata (Guenée, 1858)
Docirava postochrea (Hampson, 1893)
Docirava pudicata (Guenée, 1858)
Dooabia lunifera (Moore, 1888)
Dooabia viridata (Moore, 1867)
Doratoptera nicevillei Hampson, 1895
Dryochlora ophthalmicata (Moore, 1867)
Dysphania alloides Prout, 1916
Dysphania andamana (Moore, 1887)
Dysphania aurilimbata (Moore, 1878)
Dysphania bellona (Walker, 1854)
Dysphania flavidiscalis Warren, 1895
Dysphania jessica (Swinhoe, 1908)
Dysphania malayanus (Guérin-Meneville, 1843)
Dysphania malayanus recessa (Walker, 1861)
Dysphania militaris (Linnaeus, 1758)
Dysphania minervaria (Guenée, 1857)
Dysphania nelera (Swinhoe, 1891)
Dysphania palmyra (Stoll, 1790)
Dysphania percota (Swinhoe, 1891)
Dysphania porphyroides Prout, 1917
Dysphania prunicolor (Moore, 1879)
Dysphania subrepleta (Walker, 1854)
Dysphania subrepleta excubifor Moore, 1878
Dysstroma albiangulata Warren, 1893)
Dysstroma calamistrata (Moore, 1867)
Dysstroma cinereata (Moore, 1867)
Dysstroma dentifera Warren, 1896
Dysstroma flavifusa (Heydemann, 1929)
Dysstroma fulvipennis (Hampson, 1902)
Dysstroma planifasciata Prout, 1914
Dysstroma sikkimensis (Heydemann, 1932)
Dysstroma subapicaria Moore, 1862
Dysstroma tenebricosa Heydemann, 1929
Dysstroma truncata (Hufnagel, 1767)
Ecliptopera delecta (Butler, 1880)
Ecliptopera dentifera (Moore, 1888)
Ecliptopera dissecta (Moore, 1887)
Ecliptopera fulvidorsata (Swinhoe, 1894)
Ecliptopera fulvotincta (Hampson, 1895)
Ecliptopera furva (Swinhoe, 1891)
Ecliptopera leucoglyphica Warren, 1898)
Ecliptopera lucrosa Prout, 1940
Ecliptopera macarthuri Prout, 1938
Ecliptopera mixtilineata (Hampson, 1895)
Ecliptopera muscicolor (Moore, 1888)
Ecliptopera oblongata (Guenée, 1858)
Ecliptopera obscurata (Moore, 1867)
Ecliptopera rectilinea Warren, 1894
Ecliptopera relata (Butler, 1880)
Ecliptopera silaceata (Schiffermüller, 1775)
Ecliptopera subapicalis (Hampson, 1891)
Ecliptopera subfalcata Warren, 1893)
Ecliptopera substituta (Walker, 1866)
Ecliptopera triangulifera (Moore, 1888)
Ecliptopera zophera Prout, 1931
Ectropis bhurmitra (Walker, 1860)
Ectropis breta (Swinhoe, 1889)
Ectropis conifera (Moore, 1887)
Ectropis crepuscularia (Denis & Schiffermüller, 1775)
Ectropis dentilineata (Moore, 1867)
Ectropis dentilineata pulverosa Warren, 1896)
Ectropis deodarae Prout, 1926
Ectropis enormis Warren, 1893
Ectropis indistincta (Hampson, 1891)
Ectropis irrorata (Moore, 1887)
Ectropis marmorata (Moore, 1867)
Ectropis ochrifasciata (Moore, 1880)
Ectropis repleta Prout, 1926
Ectropis squamosa Warren, 1896)
Eilicrinia cordiaria (Hübner, 1790)
Eilicrinia flava (Moore, 1888)
Electrophaes aliena (Butler, 1880)
Electrophaes aliena mesodonta Prout, 1940
Electrophaes aspretifera Prout, 1938
Electrophaes chrysophaes Prout, 1923
Electrophaes cryopetra Prout, 1940
Electrophaes fulgidaria (Leech, 1897)
Electrophaes intertexta Warren, 1893)
Electrophaes nigrifulvaria (Hampson, 1902)
Electrophaes niveonotata (Warren, 1901)
Electrophaes niveopicta Warren, 1893)
Electrophaes zaphenges Prout, 1940
Ellipostoma straminea Warren, 1893)
Elphos hymenaria Guenée, 1858
Elphos nimia Prout, 1925
Elphos pardicelata Walker, 1862
Enantiodes consanguinea Prout, 1926
Enantiodes stellifera Warren, 1896
Entephria poliotaria (Hampson, 1902)
Entephria punctatissima Warren, 1893)
Entomopteryx amputata Guenée, 1858
Eois dissimilaris (Moore, 1887)
Eois grataria (Walker, 1861)
Eois ingrataria Warren, 1898)
Eois lunulosa (Moore, 1887)
Eois memorata (Walker, 1861)
Eois phaneroscia Prout, 1922
Eois plicata (Moore, 1888)
Epicosymbia albivertex (Swinhoe, 1892)
Epicosymbia albivertex ancillaria Warren, 1895)
Epipristis minimaria Guenée, 1857
Epipristis nelearia Guenée, 1857
Episteira nigrifrons Warren, 1907)
Episothalma ocellata (Swinhoe, 1893)
Episothalma robustaria (Guenée, 1857)
Erastria canente (Cramer, 1779)
Erastria khasiana (Swinhoe, 1899)
Erastria phoenix (Swinhoe, 1898)
Erastria swinhoei (Butler, 1880)
Erebomorpha fulguraria Walker, 1860
Erebomorpha fulgurita Walker, 1860
Eretmopus discissa (Walker, 1861)
Eretmopus marinaria (Guenée, 1857)
Erythrolophus fascicorpus Swinhoe, 1892
Erythrolophus prasonarius Swinhoe, ?
Eucrostes dispartata Walker, 1861
Eumelea algidaria Walker, 1866
Eumelea biflavata Warren, 1896
Eumelea biflavata assamensis Prout, 1929
Eumelea ludovicata Guenée, 1858
Eumelea ludovicata biclarata Prout, 1931
Eumelea rosalia Stoll, 1781
Eumelea vulpenaria Stoll, 1782
Eumelea vulpenaria feliciata Guenée, 1858
Eumelea vulpenaria florinata Guenée, 1858
Euphyia cinnamifusa Prout, 1939
Euphyia contortilinea Warren, 1896
Euphyia mediovittaria (Moore, 1867)
Euphyia ochreata (Moore, 1888)
Euphyia scortea (Swinhoe, 1891)
Euphyia stellata Warren, 1893)
Euphyia subangulata (Kollar, 1844)
Euphyia submarginata Warren, 1909)
Euphyia variegata (Moore, 1867)
Euphyia viridis Warren, 1893)
Eupithecia acolpodes Prout, 1938
Eupithecia acutangula Hampson, 1895
Eupithecia albibaltea Prout, 1958
Eupithecia albifurva Hampson, 1907
Eupithecia albigutta Prout, 1958
Eupithecia albispumata Warren, 1892
Eupithecia anasticta Prout, 1926
Eupithecia asema Hampson, 1859
Eupithecia atrisignis Butler, 1889
Eupithecia biviridata Warren, 1896)
Eupithecia chlorophora Swinhoe, 1895
Eupithecia circumacta Prout, 1958
Eupithecia conjunctiva Hampson, 1895
Eupithecia costalis (Walker, 1863)
Eupithecia costipicta Warren, 1893
Eupithecia eupitheciata (Walker, 1863)
Eupithecia fletcheri Prout, 1926
Eupithecia fulvipennis Butler, 1889
Eupithecia garuda Galsworthy & Mironov,2005
Eupithecia hemileuca Hampson, 1895
Eupithecia hypognampta Prout, 1938
Eupithecia incurvaria Hampson, 1903
Eupithecia interrubrescens Hampson, 1902)
Eupithecia invicta Vojnits, 1981
Eupithecia irambata Warren, 1893
Eupithecia lariciata mesodeicta Prout, 1938
Eupithecia latimedia Hampson, 1895
Eupithecia leucospila (Swinhoe, 1906)
Eupithecia leucotaxis Prout, 1926
Eupithecia lineosa Moore, 1888
Eupithecia lineosa gulmargensis Prout, 1938
Eupithecia lucigera Butler, 1889
Eupithecia melanolopha Swinhoe, 1895
Eupithecia nigrilinea Warren, 1896)
Eupithecia nigrinotata Swinhoe, 1895
Eupithecia ochracea Warren, 1888)
Eupithecia quadripunctata Warren, 1888
Eupithecia rajata Guenée, 1858
Eupithecia raniata Prout, 1958
Eupithecia rigida Swinhoe, 1892
Eupithecia robiginascens Prout, 1926
Eupithecia rubridorsata Hampson, 1895
Eupithecia subrubescens Warren, 1888)
Eupithecia subtacincta Hampson, 1895
Eupithecia tricrossa Prout, 1926
Eupithecia ustata Moore, 1888
Eupithecidia variegata Hampson, 1891
Euryobeidia languidata (Walker, 1915)
Eurytaphria bisinuata Hampson, 1895
Eurytaphria pachyceras Hampson, 1876
Eurytaphria pallidula Warren, 1896
Eurytaphria puratilineata (Hampson, 1895)
Eurytaphria undilineata Warren, 1897
Eurytaphria viridulata Warren, 1897
Eurytaphria xanthoperata Hampson, 1896
Eustroma aurantiaria Moore, 1867
Eustroma aurigena (Butler, 1880)
Eustroma chalcoptera (Hampson, 1895)
Eustroma elista Prout, 1940
Eustroma hampsoni Prout, 1958
Eustroma inextricata (Walker, 1866)
Eustroma lativittaria (Moore, 1867)
Eustroma melancholica venipicta Warren, 1893
Eutoea contigaria Walker, 1861
Evecliptopera decurrens Moore, 1888
Eutoea heteroneurata (Guenée, 1858)
Fascellina chromataria Walker, 1860
Fascellina dacoda Swinhoe, 1893
Fascellina hypochryseis Swinhoe, 1894
Fascellina inornata Warren, 1893
Fascellina plagiata (Walker, 1866)
Fascellina porphyreofusa Hampson, 1895
Fascellina punctata Warrren, 1898
Fascellina rectimarginata Warren, 1894
Fascellina subsignata Warrren, 1893
Fascellina vinosa Warren, 1892)
Gandaritis flavata Moore, 1867
Garaeus absona Swinhoe, 1889
Garaeus albipunctatus Hampson, 1895
Garaeus apicata (Moore, 1867)
Garaeus argillacea Butler, 1889
Garaeus colorata Warren, 1893
Garaeus cruentatus Butler, 1886
Garaeus flavipicta Hampson, 1912
Garaeus fulvata Walker, 1861
Garaeus muscorarius Hampson, 1897
Garaeus signata Butler, 1896
Garaeus specularis Moore, 1867
Gasterocome pannosaria (Moore, 1867)
Gelasma acutissima (Walker, 1861)
Gelasma acutissima goniaria (Felder, 1875)
Gelasma adaptaria Prout, 1933
Gelasma auspicata Prout, 1917
Gelasma convallata (Warren, 1896)
Gelasma dissimulata (Walker, 1861)
Gelasma dissimulata nigrifrons Hampson, 1896
Gelasma fuscifimbria Prout, 1911
Gelasma glaucaria Walker, 1866
Gelasma griseoviridis Warren, 1893
Gelasma hemitheoides Prout, 1916
Gelasma immacularia (Fabricius, 1794)
Gelasma inaptaria (Walker, 1863)
Gelasma insignipecten Prout, 1928
Gelasma mutatilinea Prout, 1916
Gelasma thetydaria (Guenée, 1857)
Gelasma veninotata Warren, 1894)
Genusa bigutta (Walker, 1855)
Geometra flavifrontaria (Guenée, 1858)
Geometra smaragdus (Butler, 1880)
Glossotrophia jacta (Swinhoe, 1884)
Gnamptoloma aventiaria (Guenée, 1858)
Gnamptopteryx perficita (Walker, 1858)
Gnophos accipitraria Guenée, 1858
Gnophos aereus Butler, 1886
Gnophos albidior (Hampson, 1895)
Gnophos albistellaria Warren, 1893)
Gnophos orphninaria Hampson, 1902
Gnophos rufitinctaria Hampson, 1902
Gnophos tephrosiaria Moore, 1887
Gnophos vitreata (Hampson, 1895)
Gnophosema isometra Warren, 1888)
Gonanticlea anticleata (Moore, 1888)
Gonanticlea aversa Swinhoe, 1892
Gonanticlea occlusata (Felder, 1875)
Gonanticlea occlusata laetifica Prout, 1931
Goniopterobola zalska (Swinhoe, 1894)
Gonodontis aethocrypta Prout, 1926
Gonodontis clelia Cramer, 1780
Gymnoscelis albicaudata Warren, 1897
Gymnoscelis confusata (Walker, 1866)
Gymnoscelis conjurata Prout, 1958
Gymnoscelis deleta Hampson, 1891
Gymnoscelis derogata (Walker, 1866)
Gymnoscelis distatica Prout, 1958
Gymnoscelis ectochloros Hampson, 1891
Gymnoscelis fasciata Hampson, 1895
Gymnoscelis imparatalis (Walker, 1865)
Gymnoscelis inexpressa Prout, 1923
Gymnoscelis latipennis Prout, 1958
Gymnoscelis polyclealis (Walker, 1859)
Gymnoscelis polyodonta Swinhoe, 1895
Gymnoscelis roseifascia Hampson, 1895
Gymnoscelis semialbida (Walker, 1866)
Gymnoscelis tibialis (Moore, 1887)
Gymnoscelis tristrigosa (Butler, 1880)
Gymnoscelis tristrigosa nasuta Prout, 1958
Hastina caeruleolineata Moore, 1888
Hastina gemmifera (Moore, 1867)
Hastina pluristrigata (Moore, 1867)
Helicopage hirundinalis Warren, 1896
Hemistola antigone Prout, 1917
Hemistola detracta (Walker, 1861)
Hemistola efformata Warren, 1893)
Hemistola fuscimargo Prout, 1935
Hemistola loxiaria Guenée, 1857
Hemistola malachitaria (Prout, 1917)
Hemistola rectlinea Warren, 1896
Hemistola rubricosta Prout, 1916
Hemistola rubrimargo Warren, 1893)
Hemistola subcaerulea Prout, 1934
Hemithea aestivaria (Hübner, 1789)
Hemithea antigrapha Prout, 1917
Hemithea costipunctata (Moore, 1867)
Hemithea insularia (Guenée, 1858)
Hemithea insularia profecta Prout, 1933
Hemithea marina (Butler, 1878)
Hemithea melalopha Prout, 1931
Hemithea tritonaria (Walker, 1863)
Hemithea wuka Pagenstecher, 1886
Herochroma baba (Swinhoe, 1932)
Herochroma cristata Warren, 1894
Herochroma elaearia Hampson, 1932
Herochroma farinosa Warren, 1893)
Herochroma flavitincta Warren, 1897)
Herochroma liliana (Swinhoe, 1892)
Herochroma ochreipicta Swinhoe, 1905
Herochroma orientalis (Holloway, 1982)
Herochroma subopalina Warren, 1894)
Herochroma subtepens (Walker, 1860)
Herochroma usneata (Felder, 1875)
Herochroma viridaria Moore, 1867
Heterabraxas fulvosparsa Hampson, 1895
Heterabraxas pardaria (Moore, 1867)
Heterabraxas spontaneata (Walker, 1862)
Heterobapta plumellata Wiltshire, 1943
Heterocallia basharica (Wehrli, 1932)
Heterocallia hepaticata (Swinhoe, 1894)
Heterocallia temeraria (Swinhoe, 1891)
Heterolocha cinerea Warren, 1896)
Heterolocha citrina Prout, 1916
Heterolocha decoloraria Hampson, 1902
Heterolocha disistaria (Walker, 1862)
Heterolocha falconaria Walker, 1866
Heterolocha hypoleuca Hampson, 1907
Heterolocha lonicerae Prout, 1926
Heterolocha obliquaria Hampson, 1902
Heterolocha patalata (Felder, 1874)
Heterolocha phoenicotaeniata Kollar, 1844
Heterophleps acineta Prout, 1926
Heterophleps bicommata Warren, 1893)
Heterophleps longiramus (Hampson, 1898)
Heterophleps ocyptaria (Swinhoe, 1893)
Heterophleps quadripuncta Warren, 1898
Heterostegane aurantiaca Warren, 1894
Heterostegane bilineata (Butler, 1883)
Heterostegane lala Swinhoe, 1892
Heterostegane latifasciata (Moore, 1887)
Heterostegane maculifascia Hampson, 1891
Heterostegane rectifascia Hampson, 1892
Heterostegane subfasciata Warren, 1899
Heterostegane subtessellata (Walker, 1862)
Heterostegane tritocampsis (Prout, 1934)
Heterostegane urbica (Swinhoe, 1895)
Heterostegania lunulosa (Moore, 1888)
Hirasa contubernalis Moore, 1888
Hirasa licheneus (Oberthür, 1886)
Hirasa muscosaria Walker, 1866
Hirasa scripturaria (Walker, 1866)
Horisme flavofasciata (Moore, 1888)
Horisme hyperythra (Hampson, 1895)
Horisme leprosa (Hampson, 1891)
Horisme nigrovittata Warren, 1888)
Horisme olivata Warren, 1901)
Horisme plurilineata (Moore, 1888)
Horisme rufipicta (Hampson, 1895)
Horisme suffusa Hampson, 1895
Hyalinetta circumflexa (Kollar, 1848)
Hybridoneura abnormis Warren, 1898
Hybridoneura metachlora (Hampson, 1907)
Hydatocapnia marginata Warren, 1893)
Hydrelia bicolorata Moore, 1867
Hydrelia cingulata Hampson, 1896
Hydrelia crocearia Hampson, 1896
Hydrelia ferruginaria (Moore, 1867)
Hydrelia flavilinea Warren, 1893)
Hydrelia lineata Warren, 1893)
Hydrelia marginipunctata Warren, 1893
Hydrelia ornata (Moore, 1867)
Hydrelia rhodoptera Hampson, 1895
Hydrelia rufigrisea Warren, 1893)
Hydrelia rufinota Hampson, 1896
Hydrelia sanguiflua Hampson, 1896
Hydrelia sericea (Butler, 1880)
Hydrelia subobliquaria (Moore, 1867)
Hydrelia undulosata Moore, 1888
Hypenorhynchus erectilineata (Moore, 1888)
Hypephyra subangulata Warren, 1896
Hypephyra terrosa Butler, 1889
Hyperythra lutea Stoll, 1781
Hyperythra susceptaria Walker, 1866
Hyperythra swinhoei Butler, 1880
Hypochroma hypochrosis (Guenée, 1858)
Hypocometa auxostira (Prout, 1925)
Hypocometa clauda Warren, 1896
Hypocometa decussata (Moore, 1867)
Hypomecis lioptilaria (Swinhoe, 1901)
Hypomecis oblivia (Prout, 1925)
Hypomecis polysticta (Hampson, 1902)
Hypomecis ratotaria (Swinhoe, 1894)
Hypomecis tetragonata (Walker, 1862)
Hypomecis transcissa (Walker, 1860)
Hyposidra albifera (Moore, 1879)
Hyposidra aquilaria Walker, 1862
Hyposidra infixaria (Walker, 1860)
Hyposidra murina (Swinhoe, 1891)
Hyposidra picaria (Walker, 1866)
Hyposidra polia Hampson, 1896
Hyposidra talaca Walker, 1860
Hyposidra violescens Hampson, 1895
Hypulia continua Walker, 1861
Hysterura cervinaria (Moore, 1868)
Hysterura multifaria (Swinhoe, 1889)
Hysterura protagma Prout, 1940
Idaea actiosaria (Walker, 1861)
Idaea acuminata (Moore, 1888)
Idaea aequisinuata Warren, 1898)
Idaea amplipennis (Butler, 1889)
Idaea andamanica Prout, 1938
Idaea bilinea (Swinhoe, 1885)
Idaea carpheraria (Hampson, 1907)
Idaea castelli (Prout, 1926)
Idaea charidotes (Prout, 1922)
Idaea chotaria (Swinhoe, 1886)
Idaea chrysocilia (Hampson, 1891)
Idaea conioptera (Hampson, 1903)
Idaea costiguttata Warren, 1896)
Idaea craspedota (Prout, 1934)
Idaea decidua Warren, 1900)
Idaea delibata (Prout, 1926)
Idaea delicatula Warren, 1901)
Idaea dilutaria Hübner, 1798
Idaea falcipennis Warren, 1893
Idaea flavisinuata Warren, 1896)
Idaea gemmaria (Hampson, 1896)
Idaea grisescens Warren, 1896)
Idaea humeraria (Walker, 1862)
Idaea improvisa (Prout, 1938)
Idaea inaudax (Prout, 1926)
Idaea indecorata Warren, 1900)
Idaea indeprensa (Prout, 1925)
Idaea indeterminata Warren, 1901)
Idaea informis Warren, 1897)
Idaea infortunata (Prout, 1938)
Idaea insuavis Butler, 1889
Idaea lacteipennis (Butler, 1889)
Idaea leucozona (Hampson, 1893)
Idaea leucozona luteata Warren, 1896)
Idaea lineata (Hampson, 1893)
Idaea macrospila (Prout, 1926)
Idaea maculata Warren, 1896)
Idaea marcidaria (Walker, 1861)
Idaea marmorata (Hampson, 1903)
Idaea mesodela (Prout, 1926)
Idaea methaemaria (Hampson, 1903)
Idaea micra (Hampson, 1893)
Idaea obliquilinea Warren, 1896)
Idaea onchnophora (Prout, 1939)
Idaea opsitelea monodia (Prout, 1938)
Idaea palniensis (Prout, 1920)
Idaea perpulverea (Hampson, 1903)
Idaea persimilis Warren, 1896)
Idaea phoenicoptera (Hampson, 1896)
Idaea profanaria (Walker, 1866)
Idaea protensa (Butler, 1889)
Idaea ptyonopoda (Hampson, 1895)
Idaea pulchrifascia (Hampson, 1903)
Idaea purpurea (Hampson, 1891)
Idaea rubellata Warren, 1896)
Idaea rubridentata Warren, 1896)
Idaea ruptifascia Warren, 1896)
Idaea sabulosa (Prout, 1913)
Idaea semilinea Warren, 1896)
Idaea semisericea Warren, 1897)
Idaea testacea (Swinhoe, 1885)
Idaea thricophora (Hampson, 1895)
Idaea triangularis (Hampson, 1895)
Idaea vacillata (Walker, 1862)
Idaea violacea (Hampson, 1891)
Idiochlora caudularia (Guenée, 1857)
Idiochlora contracta Warren, 1896
Idiochlora planata (Prout, 1917)
Idiochlora planata dorsinigrata (Prout, 1917)
Idiochlora pudentifimbria (Prout, 1912)
Idiochlora xanthochlora (Swinhoe, 1894)
Iotaphora iridicolor (Butler, 1880)
Iridoplecta ferrifera (Moore, 1888)
Isoloba bifasciata Warren, 1893
Jodis albipncta Warren, 1898
Jodis argutaria (Walker, 1866)
Jodis coeruleata Warren, 1896
Jodis delicatula Warren, 1896
Jodis inumbrata Warren, 1896
Jodis iridescens Warren, 1896
Jodis irregularis Warren, 1894)
Jodis nanda (Walker, 1861)
Jodis pallescens (Hampson, 1891)
Jodis rhabdota Prout, 1917
Jodis subtractata (Walker, 1863)
Jodis undularia Hampson, 1891
Jodis xynia Prout, 1917
Krananda diversa Warren, 1894
Krananda oliveomarginata Swinhoe, 1894
Krananda semihyalina Moore, 1867
Laciniodes denigrata Warren, 1896
Laciniodes plurilinearia (Moore, 1867)
Leptodontopera basipuncta (Moore, 1867)
Leptodontopera rufitinctaria Hampson, 1902
Leptomiza calcearia Walker, 1860
Leptomiza dentilineata (Moore, 1887)
Leptostegna asiatica Warren, 1893)
Leptostegna tenerata (Christoph, 1881)
Ligdia adustata Schiffermüller, 1775
Ligdia coctata Guenée, 1858
Lipomelia subusta Warren, 1893
Lissoblemma lunuliferata (Walker, 1862)
Lobogonia ambusta Warren, 1893
Lobogonia olivata Warren, 1896
Lobogonodes multistriata (Butler, 1889)
Lobogonodes multistriata tensa Prout, 1940
Lomographa alba Moore, 1887
Lomographa foedata Warren, 1894)
Lomographa griseola Warren, 1893)
Lomographa inamata (Walker, 1861)
Lomographa longipennis Warren, 1897)
Lomographa margarita (Moore, 1867)
Lomographa platyleucata (Walker, 1866)
Lophobates ochricostata (Hampson, 1898)
Lophomachia albiradiata Warren, 1893)
Lophomachia discipennata (Walker, 1861)
Lophomachia picturata (Hampson, 1903)
Lophomachia semialba (Walker, 1861)
Loxaspilates atrisquamata Hampson, 1907
Loxaspilates dispar Warren, 1893
Loxaspilates hastigera Butler, 1889
Loxaspilates obliquaria Moore, 1867
Loxaspilates triumbrata Warren, 1895)
Loxofidonia bareconia (Swinhoe, 1894)
Loxofidonia buda (Swinhoe, 1895)
Loxofidonia cingala Moore, 1887
Loxofidonia obfuscata Warren, 1893)
Loxorhombia idea (Swinhoe, 1890)
Luxiaria acutaria (Snellen, 1877)
Luxiaria amasa (Butler, 1878)
Luxiaria despicata Prout, 1929
Luxiaria emphatica Prout, 1925
Luxiaria hyaphanes Hampson, 1891
Luxiaria mitorrhaphes Prout, 1925
Luxiaria phyllosaria Walker, 1860
Luxiaria postvittata Walker, 1861
Luxiaria submonstrata (Walker, 1861)
Luxiaria subrasata (Walker, 1861)
Luxiaria tephrosaria (Moore, 1867)
Luxiaria turpisaria Walker, 1861
Lycaugidia albatus Swinhoe, 1885
Macaria quadraria (Moore, 1887)
Maidana tetragonata Walker, 1862
Mariaba convoluta (Walker, 1866)
Maxates coelataria (Walker, 1861)
Maxates coelataria trychera Prout, 1933
Maxates macariata (Walker, 1863)
Medasina albidaria Walker, 1866
Medasina albidentata (Moore, 1867)
Medasina basistrigaria (Moore, 1867)
Medasina cervina Warren, 1893)
Medasina combustaria (Walker, 1866)
Medasina contaminata (Moore, 1887)
Medasina creataria Guenée, 1858
Medasina dissimilis Moore, 1887
Medasina firmilinea Prout, 1926
Medasina fratercula (Moore, 1887)
Medasina gleba (Swinhoe, 1885)
Medasina interruptaria Moore, 1887
Medasina junctilinea Hampson, 1907
Medasina lampasaria Hampson, 1895
Medasina leledaria Swinhoe, 1905
Medasina livida Warren, 1893)
Medasina mauraria (Guenée, 1858)
Medasina mucidaria (Walker, 1866)
Medasina nigrovittata Moore, 1867
Medasina objectaria (Walker, 1866)
Medasina obliterata (Moore, 1867)
Medasina plumosa Hampson, 1895
Medasina pulverulenta Hampson, 1895
Medasina quadrinotata Warren, 1893
Medasina reticulata Hampson, 1895
Medasina scotosiaria Warren, 1893
Medasina sikkima (Moore, 1887)
Medasina similis Moore, 1888
Medasina strixaria Guenée, 1858
Medasina tephrosiaria Warren, 1896)
Medasina vagans (Moore, 1887)
Melanthia catenaria (Moore, 1867)
Melanthia dentistrigata Warren, 1893)
Melanthia exquisita Warren, 1893)
Menophra bicornuta Inoue, 1990
Menophra codra (Swinhoe, 1891)
Menophra costistrigata Warren, 1896)
Menophra cuprearia (Moore, 1867)
Menophra decorata (Moore, 1867)
Menophra humeraria (Moore, 1867)
Menophra jugorum (Felder, 1874)
Menophra lignata Warren, 1894
Menophra melagrapharia (Hampson, 1907)
Menophra nigrifasciata Hampson, 1891
Menophra perserrata (Walker, 1862)
Menophra retractaria (Moore, 1867)
Menophra serpentinaria Warren, 1896)
Menophra subplagiata (Walker, 1860)
Menophra subterminalis (Prout, 1925)
Menophra torridaria Moore, 1888
Menophra trilineata Warren, 1896
Mesoleuca costipannaria (Moore, 1867)
Metabraxas coryneta (Swinhoe, 1894)
Metabraxas fasciata (Swinhoe, 1894)
Metabraxas regularis Warren, 1893)
Metabraxas tincta (Hampson, 1895)
Metallaxis semipurpurascens Hampson, 1896
Metallaxis semiustus (Swinhoe, 1894)
Metallolophia ocellata Warren, 1897)
Metallolophia opalina Warren, 1893)
Metamenophra canidorsata (Walker, 1866)
Metamenophra delineata (Walker, 1860)
Metamenophra inouei (Sato, 1987)
Metamenophra subpilosa Warren, 1894)
Micrabraxas cupriscotia (Hampson, 1902)
Micrabraxas incolorata Warren, 1893
Micrabraxas melanodonta (Hampson, 1907)
Micrabraxas punctigera (Butler, 1889)
Micrabraxas tenuis Warren, 1897)
Microcalicha minima Warren, 1896)
Microloxia herbaria indecretata (Walker, 1863)
Microloxia leprosa (Hampson, 1893)
Micronissa delphinaria Swinhoe, 1893
Micrulia medioplaga (Swinhoe, 1902)
Micrulia tenuilinea Warren, 1896
Milionia basalis Walker, 1854
Milionia glauca (Stoll, 1782)
Milionia luculenta Swinhoe, 1889
Milionia pulchrinervis Felder, 1868
Mimochroa albifrons (Moore, 1888)
Mimochroa angulifascia (Moore, 1888)
Mimochroa gynopteridia (Butler, 1880)
Mimochroa hypoxantha (Kollar, 1828)
Mixocera parvulata (Walker, 1863)
Mixochlora vittata (Moore, 1867)
Mixolophia ochrolauta Warren, 1894
Monocerotesa radiata Warren, 1897)
Monocerotesa strigata Warren, 1893)
Myrioblephara duplexa Moore, 1888
Myrioblephara idaeoides (Moore, 1888)
Myrioblephara idaeoides albipunctata Warren, 1893
Myrioblephara rubrifusca Warren, 1893
Myrioblephara simplaria (Swinhoe, 1894)
Myrioblephara xanthozonea (Hampson, 1907)
Myrteta fuscolineata Swinhoe, 1894
Myrteta luteifrons (Swinhoe)
Myrteta obliqua (Hampson, 1893)
Myrteta ocernaria (Swinhoe, 1893)
Myrteta planaria Walker, 1861
Myrteta sericea (Butler, 1881)
Myrteta simpliciata (Moore, 1867)
Myrteta subpunctata Warren, 1893)
Myrteta subvitrea Hampson, 1895
Myrteta unipuncta Warren, 1893)
Nadagara comprensata Walker, 1862
Nadagara inordinata Walker, 1862
Nadagara orbipuncta Prout, 1925
Nadagara vigaia Walker, 1862
Naxa obliterata Warren, 1893)
Naxa seriaria (Motschulsky, 1866)
Naxa textilis Walker, 1856
Naxa textilis parvipuncta Prout, 1916
Naxidia irrorata (Moore, 1888)
Naxidia punctata Butler, 1886
Neohipparchus maculata Warren, 1897)
Neohipparchus vallata (Butler, 1878)
Neohipparchus variegata (Butler, 1889)
Neotephria avinoffi Prout, 1939
Neotephria ramalaria Felder, 1875
Nothocasis knyvetti (Prout, 1958)
Nothocasis sikkima (Moore, 1888)
Nothomiza achromaria (Guenée, 1858)
Nothomiza binotata Warren, 1897)
Nothomiza cinerascens (Moore, 1888)
Nothomiza costalis (Moore, 1867)
Nothomiza costinotata Warren, 1893)
Nothomiza dentisignata (Moore, 1867)
Nothomiza nana Warren, 1897
Nothomiza peralba (Swinhoe, 1894)
Nothomiza viridis Warren, 1893
Nycterosea obstipata (Fabricius, 1794)
Obeidia diversicolor Warren, 190
Obeidia fumosa Warren, 1893
Obeidia lucifera Swinhoe, 1893
Obeidia millepunctata Warren, 1893
Obeidia tigrata (Guenée, 1857)
Ocoelophora agana Prout, 1926
Ocoelophora maculifera Warren, 1896
Ocoelophora ochreifusca (Hampson, 1896)
Odontopera angularia (Moore, 1867)
Odontopera bilinearia (Swinhoe, 1889)
Odontopera bivittaria (Moore, 1867)
Odontopera cervinaria (Moore, 1867)
Odontopera fuscilinea (Hampson, 1907)
Odontopera heydena (Swinhoe, 1894)
Odontopera justa (Prout, 1928)
Odontopera kametaria (Felder, 1873)
Odontopera lentiginosaria (Moore, 1867)
Odontopera obliquaria (Moore, 1867)
Odontopera similaria (Moore, 1888)
Oenospila flavifusata (Walker, 1861)
Oenospila strix (Butler, 1889)
Omphacodes directa (Walker, 1861)
Onagrodes obscurata Warren, 1896
Onellaba botydata Walker, 1862
Ophthalmitis caritaria (Walker, 1860)
Ophthalmitis herbidaria (Guenée, 1858)
Ophthalmitis irrorataria (Bremer & Grey, 1853)
Ophthalmitis lectularia Swinhoe, 1891
Ophthalmitis pertusaria Felder, 1874
Ophthalmitis sinensium Oberthür, 1913
Ophthalmitis striatifera Hampson, 1902
Ophthalmitis cordularia (Swinhoe, 1893)
Ophthalmitis diurnaria Guenée, 1858
Opisthograptis crataegata Linnaeus, 1761
Opisthograptis irrorata (Hampson, 1895)
Opisthograptis moelleri Warren, 1893
Opisthograptis sulphurea (Butler, 1880)
Opisthograptis tridentifera Moore, 1888
Opisthotia tumidilinea (Moore, 1888)
Organopoda annulifera (Butler, 1889)
Organopoda annulifera signifera Prout, 1938
Organopoda carnearia (Walker, 1861)
Organopoda carnearia himalaica Prout, 1938
Ornithospila avicularia (Guenée, 1857)
Ornithospila esmeralda (Hampson, 1895)
Ornithospila lineata (Moore, 1872)
Orthoserica rufigrisea Warren, 1896
Osteosema alboviridis (Moore, 1872)
Osteosema pastor Butler, 1880
Osteosema sanguilineata (Moore, 1867)
Ourapteryx clara Butler, 1880
Ourapteryx ebuleata (Guenée, 1858)
Ourapteryx excellens (Butler, 1889)
Ourapteryx margaritata (Moore, 1868)
Ourapteryx marginata (Hampson, 1895)
Ourapteryx multistrigaria Walker, 1866
Ourapteryx peermaadiata Thierry-Mieg, 1903
Ourapteryx picticaudata (Walker, 1860)
Ourapteryx pluristrigata Warren, 1888)
Ourapteryx podaliriata (Guenée, 1858)
Ourapteryx primularis (Butler, 1886)
Ourapteryx sciticaudaria (Walker, 1862)
Ourapteryx triangularia Moore, 1867
Oxymacaria ceylonica Hampson, 1902
Oxymacaria palliata Hampson, 1891
Oxymacaria pectinata Hampson, 1902
Ozola extersaria (Walker, 1861)
Ozola falcipennis (Moore, 1888)
Ozola impedita biangulifera (Moore, 1888)
Ozola macariata (Walker, 1863)
Ozola microniaria Walker, 1862
Ozola minor (Moore, 1888)
Ozola picaria (Swinhoe, 1892)
Ozola sinuicosta Prout, 1910
Ozola sinuicosta grisescens Prout, 1910
Palaeaspilates ocularia (Fabricius, 1775)
Palaeaspilates rufaria Warren, 1896)
Palaeomystis falcataria (Moore, 1867)
Palpoctenidia phoenicosoma (Swinhoe, 1895)
Pamphlebia rubrolimbraria (Guenée, 1857)
Panulia ajaia (Walker, 1859)
Panulia lapidata Warren, 1893)
Panulia vulsipennis (Prout, 1934)
Paradarisa chloauges (Prout, 1927)
Paradarisa comparataria (Walker, 1866)
Paradarisa heledaria (Swinhoe, 1893)
Paralcis conspicuata (Moore, 1888)
Paralcis rufaria Warren, 1896
Paralcis subochrea Warren, 1896
Paralcis thricophora (Hampson, 1895)
Paramaxates polygrapharia (Walker, 1860)
Paramaxates posterecta Holloway, 1976
Paramaxates vagata (Walker)
Parasynegia atomaria Warren, 1896
Parasynegia complicata Warren, 1893
Parasynegia diffusaria (Moore, 1868)
Parasynegia lidderdalii (Butler, 1880)
Parasynegia macularia Warren, 1894
Parasynegia nigriclavata Warren, 1897
Parasynegia pluristriata (Walter, 1863)
Parasynegia rufinervis Warren, 1896
Parasynegia submissa Warren, 1894
Parasynegia suffusa Warren, 1893
Parasynegia vitticostata (Walker, 1862)
Parazoma ferax Prout, 1926
Parazoma hypobasis Prout, 1931
Parazoma semifusca Warren, 1896
Pareclipsis gracilis (Butler, 1879)
Pareclipsis umbrata Warren, 1893
Parectropis conspurcata (Walker, 1866)
Pareumelea eugeniata (Guenée, 1858)
Pareumelea fimbriata (Stoll, 1782)
Pareustroma fissisignis (Butler, 1880)
Peetula exanthemata Moore, 1888
Peetula stramineata Warren, 1888)
Pentheochlora uniformis (Hampson, 1895)
Peratophyga hyalinata Kollar, 1844
Peratophyga xanthyala (Hampson, 1896)
Percnia belluaria Guenée, 1858
Percnia confusa Warren, 1894
Percnia ductaria (Walker, 1862)
Percnia felinaria Guenée, 1858
Percnia foraria (Guenée, 1858)
Percnia giraffata (Guenée, 1858)
Percnia interfusa Warren, 1893
Percnia maculata (Moore, 1867)
Perizoma affinis (Moore, 1888)
Perizoma albidivisa Warren, 1893
Perizoma albofasciata (Moore, 1888)
Perizoma antisticta Prout, 1938
Perizoma antisticta methemon Prout, 1939
Perizoma apicistrigata Warren, 1893
Perizoma bicolor Warren, 1893
Perizoma cerva (Hampson, 1902)
Perizoma conjuncta Warren, 1893
Perizoma constricta Warren, 1901
Perizoma decorata (Moore, 1888)
Perizoma fasciata Warren, 1893
Perizoma fulvimacula (Hampson, 1896)
Perizoma herrichiata (Snellen, 1874)
Perizoma interrupta Warren, 1893
Perizoma lacernigera (Butler, 1889)
Perizoma lacteiguttata Warren, 1893
Perizoma maculata (Moore, 1888)
Perizoma minuta (Butler, 1889)
Perizoma minuta latifasciata Warren, 1893
Perizoma mordax Prout, 1939
Perizoma olivacea Warren, 1893)
Perizoma plumbeata (Moore, 1888)
Perizoma rectifasciata Hampson, 1902
Perizoma schistacea (Moore, 1888)
Perizoma seriata (Moore, 1888)
Perizoma tenuifascia Warren, 1896
Perizoma triplagiata Warren, 1896
Perizoma variabilis Warren, 1893
Perizoma variabilis condignata Prout, 1938
Petelia albopunctata (Swinhoe, 1891)
Petelia capitata (Walker, 1867)
Petelia fasciata (Moore, 1868)
Petelia immaculata Hampson, 1893
Petelia medardaria Herrich-Schäffer, 1856
Petelia vexillaria (Swinhoe, 1885)
Pholodes fuliginea (Hampson, 1895)
Pholodes nigrescens Warren, 1893)
Pholodes squamosa Warren, 1896)
Photoscotosia albapex Hampson, 1895
Photoscotosia amplicata (Walker, 1862)
Photoscotosia annubilata Prout, 1940
Photoscotosia atromarginata Warren, 1893
Photoscotosia dejuncta Prout, 1937
Photoscotosia fulguritis Warren, 1893
Photoscotosia metachryseis Hampson, 1896
Photoscotosia miniosata (Walker, 1862)
Photoscotosia multilinea Warren, 1893
Photoscotosia nubilata Moore, 1888
Photoscotosia obliquisignata Moore, 1867
Photoscotosia undulosa (Alphéraky, 1888)
Phthonandria atrilineata Butler, 1881
Phthonandria atrilineata indica Inoue, 1990
Phthonandria conjunctiva Warren, 1896
Phthonoloba fasciata (Moore, 1888)
Physetobasis annulata Hampson, 1891
Physetobasis dentifascia Hampson, 1895
Physetobasis griseipennis Moore, 1888
Piercia divergens (Butler, 1889)
Piercia imbrata (Guenée, 1858)
Pingasa alba Swinhoe, 1891
Pingasa chlora (Stoll, 1752)
Pingasa chlora crenaria (Guenée, 1858)
Pingasa dispensata (Walker, 1862)
Pingasa elutriata Prout, 1916
Pingasa lariaria (Walker, 1860)
Pingasa multispurcata Prout, 1913
Pingasa pseudoterpinaria (Guenée, 1858)
Pingasa pseudoterpinaria gracilis Prout, 1916
Pingasa pseudoterpinaria tephrosiaria Guenée, 1858
Pingasa rubicunda Warren, 1894
Pingasa rufofasciata Moore, 1888
Pingasa ruginaria Guenée, 1857
Pingasa ruginaria andamanica Prout, 1916
Pingasa subviridis Warren, 1896
Pingasa venusta Warren, 1894
Plagodis inusitaria (Moore, 1867)
Plagodis reticulata Warren, 1893
Platycerota olivatia Hampson, 1902
Platycerota spilotelaria (Walker, 1862)
Plutodes costatus (Butler, 1886)
Plutodes cyclaria Guenée, 1858
Plutodes discigera Butler, 1880
Plutodes exiguifascia Hampson, 1895
Plutodes exquisita Butler, 1880
Plutodes flavescens Butler, 1880
Plutodes lamisca Swinhoe, 1894
Plutodes nilgirica Hampson, 1895
Plutodes philornia Prout, 1926
Plutodes subcaudata Butler, 1880
Plutodes transmutata Walker, 1861
Pogonopygia nigralbata Warren, 1894
Polynesia curtitibia Prout, 1912
Polynesia sunandava Walker, 1861
Polynesia truncapex Swinhoe, 1892
Polystroma adumbrata (Kollar, 1844)
Pomasia denticlathrata Warren, 1893
Pomasia parerga Prout, 1941
Pomasia psylaria Guenée, 1858
Pomasia pulchrilinea Walker, 1866
Pomasia punctaria Hampson, 1912
Pomasia reticulata Hampson, 1895
Pomasia sparsata Hampson, 1902
Praegnophosema drypepes Prout, 1935
Prasinocyma floresaria (Walker, 1866)
Prasinocyma perpulverata Prout, 1916
Prionodonta amethystina Warren, 1893
Pristostegania trilineata (Moore, 1867)
Probithia exclusa Walker, 1860
Problepsis albidior Warren, 1899
Problepsis apollinaria Guenée, 1858
Problepsis apollinaria candidior Prout, 1917
Problepsis conjunctiva Warren, 1893
Problepsis crassinotata Prout, 1917
Problepsis deliaria (Guenée, 1858)
Problepsis delphiaria (Guenée, 1858)
Problepsis longipannis Prout, 1917
Problepsis ocellata cinerea Butler, 1886
Problepsis vulgaris Butler, 1889
Prochasma dentilinea Warren, 1893)
Prochasma mimica Warren, 1897
Prometopidia conisaria Hampson, 1902
Proomphe lobata Warren, 1896
Prorhinia pallidaria Moore, 1881
Prorhinia pingasoides (Warrren, 1893)
Protonebula combusta (Swinhoe, 1894)
Protonebula cupreata (Moore, 1867)
Pseudalcis renaria (Guenée, 1858)
Pseudeuchlora kafebera (Swinhoe, 1894)
Pseudiodis albidentula (Hampson, 1907)
Pseudiodis unifascia Hampson, 1891
Pseudomimetis picta Warren, 1901)
Pseudomiza argentilinea (Moore, 1867)
Pseudomiza castanearia (Moore, 1867)
Pseudomiza cruentaria (Moore, 1867)
Pseudomiza flava Moore, 1888
Pseudomiza leucogonia (Hampson, 1895)
Pseudomiza ochrilinea Warren, 1896)
Pseudomiza viridispurca Prout, 1927
Pseudopanthera himaleyica (Kollar, 1848)
Pseudosterrha paulula (Swinhoe, 1886)
Psyra anglifera Walker, 1866
Psyra cuneata Walker, 1860
Psyra debilis Warren, 1888
Psyra similaria (Moore, 1888)
Psyra spurcataria (Walker, 1862)
Psyra trilineata (Moore, 1888)
Ptochophyle marginata Warren, 1897)
Ptocophyle flavipuncta (Prout, 1938)
Ptocophyle permutans (Hampson, 1891)
Ptocophyle togata (Fabricius, 1798)
Ptocophyle tristicula (Swinhoe, 1885)
Ptocophyle volutaria (Swinhoe, 1886)
Pyrrhorachis caerulea Warren, 1893)
Pyrrhorachis cornuta Warren, 1896
Pyrrhorachis cosmetocraspeda Prout, 1918
Pyrrhorachis pyrrhogona (Walker, 1866)
Pyrrhorachis pyrrhogona turgescens Prout, 1917
Racotis boarmiaria Guenée, 1858
Racotis discistigmaria (Hampson, 1902)
Racotis inconclusa Walker, 1860
Racotis sordida Warren, 1896
Rheumaptera abraxidia (Hampson, 1895)
Rheumaptera anestia (Prout, 1941)
Rheumaptera hypolopha (Hampson, 1895)
Rheumaptera scotaria Hampson, 1907
Rheumaptera titubata (Prout, 1941)
Rheumaptera tremodes (Prout, 1940)
Rhodometra sacraria (Linnaeus, 1767)
Rhodostrophia anomala Warren, 1895
Rhodostrophia bicolor Warren, 1895
Rhodostrophia cinerascens (Moore, 1888)
Rhodostrophia cinerascens borealis (Swinhoe, 1889)
Rhodostrophia dissoluta Prout, 1938
Rhodostrophia glaucofusa (Hampson, 1907)
Rhodostrophia haematozona Hampson, 1895
Rhodostrophia herbicolens (Butler, 1883)
Rhodostrophia inaffectata Prout, 1938
Rhodostrophia inconspicua (Butler, 1886)
Rhodostrophia meonaria (Guenée, 1857)
Rhodostrophia muricolor Warren, 1897
Rhodostrophia olivacea Warren, 1895
Rhodostrophia pelloniaria (Guenée, 1858)
Rhodostrophia pelloniaria khasiana (Moore, 1888)
Rhodostrophia peregrina (Kollar, 1844)
Rhodostrophia poliaria Hampson, 1903
Rhodostrophia poliaria excellens Prout, 1938
Rhodostrophia pulverearia Hampson, 1903
Rhodostrophia similata (Moore, 1888)
Rhodostrophia stigmatica (Butler, 1889)
Rhodostrophia subrufa Warren, 1897
Rhodostrophia tristrigalis Butler, 1889
Rhodostrophia vinacearia Moore, 1867
Rhomborista devexata (Walker, 1861)
Rhomborista semipurpurea Warren, 1897
Rhynchobapta cervinaria Moore, 1888
Rhynchobapta eburnivena Warren, 1896)
Rhynchobapta flaviceps Butler, 1881
Rhynchobapta irrorata Hampson, 1902
Rhynchobapta punctilinearia (Leech, 1891)
Ruttelerona cessaria (Walker, 1860)
Ruttelerona harmonica Hampson, 1895
Sabaria costimaculata (Moore, 1867)
Sabaria euchroes Prout, 1917
Sabaria incitata (Walker, 1862)
Sabaria intexta (Swinhoe, 1891)
Sabaria lithosiaria (Walker, 1862)
Sabaria obliquilineata Warren, 1893)
Sabaria pallida (Moore, 1877)
Sabaria rondelaria (Fabricius, 1775)
Sabaria serpentinaria (Walker, 1866)
Sarcinodes aequilinearia (Walker, 1860)
Sarcinodes carnearia Guenée, 1857
Sarcinodes debitaria (Walker, 1863)
Sarcinodes lilacina Moore, 1888
Sarcinodes restitutaria (Walker, 1862)
Sarcinodes susana (Swinhoe, 1891)
Sauris abnormis (Moore, 1888)
Sauris bicolor Warren, 1896)
Sauris cinerosa Warren, 1894
Sauris eupitheciata (Snellen, 1881)
Sauris hirudinata Guenée, 1858
Sauris ignobilis Butler, 1880
Sauris improspera Prout, 1931
Sauris inscissa Prout, 1958
Sauris interruptata (Moore, 1888)
Sauris lineosa (Moore, 1888)
Sauris nigrifusalis Warren, 1896
Sauris nigripalpata Walker, 1862
Sauris perfasciata Hampson, 1895
Sauris proboscidaria Walker, 1862
Scardamia metallaria Guenée, 1858
Scardamia rectilinea Warren, 1896
Scardamia seminigra Prout, 1925
Schistophyle falcifera Warren, 1896
Sciadia tenebraria (Esper, 1806)
Scionomia lignicolor Warren, 1893)
Scopula acharis Prout, 1938
Scopula achrosta Prout, 1935
Scopula actuaria (Walker, 1861)
Scopula addictaria (Walker, 1861)
Scopula adeptaria (Walker, 1861)
Scopula albiflava Warren, 1896)
Scopula albomaculata (Moore, 1888)
Scopula anaitisaria (Walker, 1861)
Scopula annexata Prout, 1938
Scopula annularia (Swinhoe, 1890)
Scopula asparta Prout, 1938
Scopula aspilataria (Walker, 1861)
Scopula atriceps (Hampson, 1895)
Scopula atridiscata Warren, 1897)
Scopula attentata nicobarica Prout, 1938
Scopula bispurcata Warren, 1898)
Scopula butyrosa Warren, 1893)
Scopula caesaria (Walker, 1861)
Scopula campbelli Prout, 1920
Scopula celebraria (Walker, 1861)
Scopula cleoraria (Walker, 1861)
Scopula coangulata Prout, 1920
Scopula complanata Warren, 1896)
Scopula consimilata Warren, 1896)
Scopula costata (Moore, 1887)
Scopula decorata eurhythma Prout, 1935
Scopula deliciosaria (Walker, 1861)
Scopula dimoera Prout, 1922
Scopula emissaria (Walker, 1861)
Scopula erubescens Warren, 1895)
Scopula eulomata (Snellen, 1877)
Scopula extimaria (Walker, 1861)
Scopula ferrilineata (Moore, 1888)
Scopula ferruginea (Hampson, 1893)
Scopula fibulata (Guenée, 1858)
Scopula flavifurfurata Prout, 1920
Scopula fluidaria (Swinhoe, 1886)
Scopula furfurata Warren, 1897)
Scopula humilis Prout, 1913
Scopula hyphenophora Warren, 1896)
Scopula idearia (Swinhoe, 1886)
Scopula inangulata Warren, 1896)
Scopula incanata (Linnaeus, 1758)
Scopula inflexibilis Prout, 1931
Scopula insolata (Butler, 1889)
Scopula intensata (Moore, 1887)
Scopula intensata ochriata Prout, 1938
Scopula kashmirensis (Moore, 1888)
Scopula kashmirensis gooraisensis Prout, 1935
Scopula kashmirensis quettensis Prout, 1935
Scopula linearis (Hampson, 1891)
Scopula mecysma (Swinhoe, 1894)
Scopula melanstigma Prout, 1938
Scopula modesta (Moore, 1887)
Scopula monosema Prout, 1923
Scopula moorei (Cotes & Swinhoe, 1888)
Scopula moorei metarsia Prout, 1938
Scopula nesciaria (Walker, 1861)
Scopula nigridentata Warren, 1896
Scopula nitidissima Prout, 1920
Scopula ocheracea (Hampson, 1891)
Scopula ochricrinita Prout, 1920
Scopula opicata (Fabricius, 1798)
Scopula pallida Warren, 1888)
Scopula patularia (Walker, 1866)
Scopula pedilata (Felder, 1875)
Scopula polystigmaria Hampson, 1903
Scopula prosthiostigma Prout, 1938
Scopula pulchellata (Fabricius, 1794)
Scopula pulverosa (Prout, 1934)
Scopula quinquestriata Warren, 1896)
Scopula remotata (Guenée, 1858)
Scopula rufistigma Warren, 1895)
Scopula scialophia Prout, 1919
Scopula sordida Warren, 1895)
Scopula stigmata (Moore, 1888)
Scopula subcarnea Warren, 1934)
Scopula sublutescens Prout, 1920
Scopula subpartita Prout, 1919
Scopula subtracta Prout, 1935
Scopula tenuimedia Prout, 1938
Scopula undulataria Moore, 1888
Scopula unilineata Warren, 1896)
Scopula violacea Warren, 1897)
Scopula walkeri (Butler, 1883)
Scotopteryx arthuri (Prout, 1939)
Scotopteryx duplicata Warren, 1853)
Scotopteryx fissiferata (Walker, 1862)
Scotopteryx junctata (Staudinger, 1882)
Scotopteryx leucocypta (Hampson, 1902)
Scotopteryx nasifera Warren, 1888)
Scotopteryx roseicilia (Hampson, 1895)
Scotopteryx roseifascia (Hampson, 1895)
Semiothisa acutaria (Walker, 1869)
Semiothisa apataria (Swinhoe, 1893)
Semiothisa atmala (Swinhoe, 1894)
Semiothisa avitusaria (Walker, 1860)
Semiothisa azataria (Swinhoe, 1893)
Semiothisa effusata (Guenée, 1857)
Semiothisa eleonora (Stoll, 1780)
Semiothisa elvirata (Guenée, 1858)
Semiothisa emersaria (Walker, 1861)
Semiothisa emersaria albidulata Warren, 1898
Semiothisa fasciata (Stoll, 1780)
Semiothisa fidoniata (Guenée, 1858)
Semiothisa frugaliata (Guenée, 1858)
Semiothisa fumipennis (Hampson, 1895)
Semiothisa honoria (Hampson, 1912)
Semiothisa inchoata (Walker, 1861)
Semiothisa maculosata Warren, 1896
Semiothisa myandaria (Walker, 1863)
Semiothisa nora (Walker, 1861)
Semiothisa octolinearia (Swinhoe, 1894)
Semiothisa oliva (Swinhoe, 1894)
Semiothisa ozararia (Walker, 1860)
Semiothisa penumbrata Warren, 1896
Semiothisa perfumata (Bastelberger, 1907)
Semiothisa perfusaria (Walker, 1866)
Semiothisa pervolgata (Walker, 1861)
Semiothisa placida (Moore, 1888)
Semiothisa pluviata (Fabricius, 1795)
Semiothisa posticaria (Walker, 1869)
Semiothisa psammodes (Bastelberger, 1907)
Semiothisa quadraria (Moore, 1887)
Semiothisa ruptifascia Warren, 1896 )
Semiothisa streniataria (Walker, 1861)
Semiothisa subalbataria (Swinhoe, 1889)
Semiothisa subcaudaria (Walker, 1861)
Semiothisa sufflata (Guenée, 1858)
Semiothisa triangulata (Hampson, 1891)
Semiothisa trillinearia (Moore, 1888)
Semiothisa variolinea Warren, 1896 )
Semiothisa xanthonora (Walker, 1861)
Sirinopteryx quadripunctata Moore, 1867
Sirinopteryx rufilineata Warren, 1893
Sirinopteryx rufivinctata Walker, 1862
Sirinopteryx undulifera Warren, 1893
Somatina anthophilata Guenée, 1857
Somatina omicraria Fabricius, 1798
Somatina plynusaria (Walker, 1862)
Somatina postlineata Warren, 1899
Somatina purpurascens (Moore, 1887)
Somatina rosacea Swinhoe, 1894
Spaniocentra isiopania Prout, 1917
Spaniocentra lyra (Swinhoe, 1892)
Spaniocentra pannosa (Moore, 1887)
Sphagnodela lucida Warren, 1893
Spilopera anomala Warren, 1893
Spilopera divaricata Moore, 1888
Stamnodes elwesi Alphéraky, 1895
Stamnodes pauperaria pamphilata (Felder, 1875)
Stenorumia ablunata (Guenée, 1858)
Stenorumia duplicilinea Hampson, 1895
Stenorumia longipennis Warren, 1893)
Swannia marmorea Prout, 1926
Symmacra genuflexus (Hampson, 1895)
Symmacra regularis Warren, 1896
Symmacra solidaria (Guenée, 1858)
Symmacra solidaria validaria (Walker, 1866)
Symmimetis cristata Warren, 1897
Synegia camptogrammaria (Guenée, 1858)
Synegia conflagrata Hampson, 1912
Synegia erythra (Hampson, 1891)
Synegia eumeleata Walker, 1861
Synegia imitaria (Walker, 1861)
Synegia maculosata Warren, 1896)
Synegia medionubis Prout, 1925
Synegiodes diffusifascia Swinhoe, 1892
Synegiodes histrionaria Swinhoe, 1892
Synegiodes hyriaria (Walker, 1866)
Synegiodes obliquifascia Prout, 1918
Synegiodes sanguinaria (Moore, 1867)
Sysstema albipicta Warren, 1893)
Sysstema longiplaga Prout, 1923
Sysstema semicirculata (Moore, 1867)
Syzeuxis heteromeces Prout, 1926
Syzeuxis magnidica Prout, 1926
Syzeuxis nigrinotata Warren, 1896)
Syzeuxis seminanis Prout, 1926
Syzeuxis tessellifimbria Prout, 1926
Syzeuxis trinotaria (Moore, 1867)
Tanaoctenia haliaria (Walker, 1861)
Tanaorrhinus kina Swinhoe, 1893
Tanaorrhinus kina embrithes Prout, 1934
Tanaorrhinus rafflesii (Moore, 1859)
Tanaorrhinus reciprocata Walker, 1861
Tanaorrhinus viridiluteata (Walker, 1861)
Tasta micaceata Walker, 1862
Tasta reflexa Swinhoe, 1902
Tasta sectinota Hampson, 1895
Tephrina catalaunaria (Guenée, 1858)
Tephrina disputaria Guenée, 1858
Tephrina fumosa Hampson, 1891
Tephrina perviaria (Lederer, 1855)
Terpna apicalis (Moore, 1888)
Terpna costistrigaria (Moore, 1867)
Terpna crocina (Butler, 1880)
Terpna differens Warren, 1909
Terpna dorcada (Swinhoe, 1893)
Terpna erionoma (Swinhoe, 1893)
Terpna funebrosa Warren, 1896
Terpna haemataria Herrich-Schäffer, 1854
Terpna leopardinata (Moore, 1867)
Terpna luteipes (Felder, 1875)
Terpna luteipes ruficosta Hampson, 1891
Terpna moelleri Warren, 1893)
Terpna ornataria (Moore, 1888)
Terpna pictaria (Moore, 1888)
Terpna subornata Warren, 1894)
Terpna varicoloraria Moore, 1867
Terpna vigens (Butler, 1880)
Thalassodes aptifimbria Prout, 1916
Thalassodes aucta Prout, 1912
Thalassodes chloropis Meyrick, 1886
Thalassodes curiosa Swinhoe, 1902
Thalassodes dissepta Walker, 1861
Thalassodes dissita Walker, 1861
Thalassodes dissitoides Holloway, 1996
Thalassodes falsaria Prout, 1912
Thalassodes hypocrites Prout, 1912
Thalassodes immissaria Walker, 1861
Thalassodes leucospilota Moore, 1887
Thalassodes opalina Butler, 1880
Thalassodes quadraria Guenée, 1857
Thalassodes veraria Guenée, 1857
Thalera aeruginata Warren, 1893)
Thera comis (Butler, 1879)
Thera comitabilis Prout, 1923
Thera dentifasciata (Hampson, 1895)
Thera etes Prout, 1926
Thera exangulata Warren, 1909)
Thera undulata Warren, 1880)
Thinopteryx citrina Warren, 1894
Thinopteryx crocoptera (Kollar, 1844)
Thinopteryx nebulosa Butler, 1883
Thinopteryx praetoraria Felder, 1873
Timandra amataria griseata (Petersen, 1902)
Timandra convectaria Warren, 1861
Timandra correspondens (Hampson, 1895)
Timandra nelsoni Prout, 1918
Timandra obsoleta Warren, 1897
Timandra responsaria Moore, 1888
Timandra ruptilinea Warren, 1897
Timandromorpha discolor Warren, 1896)
Traminda mundissima (Walker, 1861)
Trichoplites cuprearia (Moore, 1867)
Trichoplites cuprearia etesias Prout, 1939
Trichoplites lateritiata (Moore, 1888)
Trichopterigia decorata Moore, 1888
Trichopterigia macularia (Moore, 1867)
Trichopterigia micradelpha Prout, 1958
Trichopterigia nigrisculpta Warren, 1897)
Trichopterigia nigronotata Warren, 1893)
Trichopterigia pilcheri Prout, 1958
Trichopterigia pulcherrima (Swinhoe, 1893)
Trichopterigia rivularis Warren, 1893
Trichopterigia rufinotata (Butler, 1889)
Trichopterigia sanguinipunctata Warren, 1893)
Trichopterigia sphenorrhyma Prout, 1926
Trichopterigia teligera Prout, 1958
Trichopterigia ustimargo Warren, 1896
Triphosa acutipennis Warren, 1896
Triphosa albiplaga (Oberthür, 1887)
Triphosa confusaria tarachodes Prout, 1941
Triphosa corrasata Warren, 1897
Triphosa dubiosata (Walker, 1862)
Triphosa empodia Prout, 1941
Triphosa expansa (Moore, 1888)
Triphosa mnestira Prout, 1938
Triphosa nigralbata Warren, 1888)
Triphosa oenozona Prout, 1923
Triphosa pallescens Warren, 1896
Triphosa rubrodotata (Walker, 1862)
Triphosa tremulata (Guenée, 1858)
Triphosa venimaculata (Moore, 1867)
Tyloptera bella (Butler, 1878)
Tyloptera bella taracta Prout, 1958
Uliocnemis biplagiata (Moore, 1887)
Uliocnemis partita (Walker, 1861)
Venusia albinea (Prout, 1938)
Venusia brevipectinata Prout, 1938
Venusia lilacina Warren, 1893)
Venusia lilacina rala Prout, 1938
Venusia obliquisigna (Moore, 1888)
Venusia ochrota Hampson, 1903
Venusia pallidaria Hampson, 1903
Venusia phasma (Butler, 1879)
Venusia purpuraria (Hampson, 1895)
Venusia sikkimensis (Elwes, 1893)
Viidaleppia consimilis Warren, 1888)
Vindusara metachromata Walker, 1862
Vindusara moorei (Thierry-Mieg, 1899)
Xandrames albofasciata Moore, 1867
Xandrames dholaria (Moore, 1868)
Xandrames latiferaria (Walker, 1860)
Xanthorhoe castanea Warren, 1901
Xanthorhoe curcumata Moore, 1939
Xanthorhoe curcumoides (Prout, 1923)
Xanthorhoe designata Hufnagel, 1767
Xanthorhoe fumipennis (Hampson, 1891)
Xanthorhoe griseiviridis (Hampson, 1896)
Xanthorhoe hampsoni Prout, 1925
Xanthorhoe magnificata (Walker, 1862)
Xanthorhoe mecoterma Prout, 1938
Xanthorhoe molata (Felder, 1875)
Xanthorhoe saturata (Guenée, 1857)
Xanthorhoe sordidata (Moore, 1885)
Xanthorhoe trusa Prout, 1939
Xenographia adustata (Moore, 1887)
Xenographia lignataria Warren, 1893
Xenographia manifesta Warren, 1897
Xenographia semifusca Hampson, 1895
Xenortholitha latifusata (Walker, 1862)
Xenortholitha propinguata (Kollar, 1844)
Xenortholitha propinguata epigrypa Prout, 1939
Xenozancla versicolor Warren, 1893
Xerodes ypsaria Guenée, 1858
Xeropteryx columbicola (Walker, 1860)
Zamarada eogenaria (Snellen, 1883)
Zamarada eogenaria cosmiaria Swinhoe, 1893
Zamarada excisa Hampson, 1891
Zamarada minimaria Swinhoe, 1895
Zamarada symmetra D. S. Fletcher, 1974
Zamarada translucida Moore, 1887
Zanclopera falcata Warren, 1894
Zeheba lucidata Walker, 1866
Ziridava rubridisca (Hampson, 1891)
Ziridava rufinigra Swinhoe, 1895
Ziridava xylinaria (Walker, 1863)
Ziridava xylinaria khasiensis Prout, 1958
Zygophyxia conscensa Swinhoe, 1885
Zygophyxia relictata (Walker, 1866)
Zythos avellanea (Prout, 1932)
Zythos turbata (Walker, 1862)

References

Related pages
Geometridae
List of moths of India

 
x
M